This is a list of cricket grounds in Afghanistan. The Afghan national cricket team does not play its home matches inside Afghanistan due to the ongoing security situation and the lack of international standard facilities.

The President of the Afghanistan Cricket Board, Omar Zakhilwal, announced in October 2010 that the government plan aimed at constructing 10 stadiums and establishing up to 15 cricket academies.

References

External links
 cricket Afghanistan
 Afgcric site
 Afghanistan Cricket
 Cricinfo-Afghanistan
 Afghan pages on asiancricket.org

Afghanistan
Cricket grounds in Afghanistan
Cricket
Grounds